Euonymus dichotomus  is a species of flowering plant in the family Celastraceae, native to Western Ghats.

References

External links
 Euonymus dichotomus B.Heyne ex Wall at The Plant List.

dichotomus
Flora of India (region)